"Undressed" is a song Swedish-Greek-Guadeloupe singer-songwriter Kim Cesarion from his debut album Undressed. It was released as the album's lead single in Sweden on 22 March 2013 through Aristotracks, RCA Records, and Sony Music. The song was written and produced by Arnthor Birgisson and Gary Clark, and it was co-written by Cesarion and Lukasz Duchnowski.

Music video
A music video to accompany the release of "Undressed" was first released onto YouTube on 11 June 2013 at a total length of three minutes and fifty-four seconds.

Track listing

Charts

Weekly charts

Year-end charts

Certifications

Release history

References

External links
Kim Cesarion Official website
Facebook

2013 debut singles
2013 songs
Songs written by Arnthor Birgisson
Songs written by Gary Clark (musician)